Michael Jonathan Cloud (born May 13, 1975) is an American politician representing Texas's 27th congressional district in the United States House of Representatives since 2018. He is a member of the Republican Party.

Early life and career 
Cloud graduated from Oral Roberts University in 1997 with a Bachelor of Science in mass media communications. At Oral Roberts, he was on the cross country and track teams. He chaired the Victoria County Republican Party from 2010 to 2017.

U.S. House of Representatives

Elections

2018 special election 

Cloud succeeded Republican Blake Farenthold, who resigned amid controversy due to settling a sexual harassment lawsuit with public money. He won the Republican runoff for the regularly scheduled election with help from the Club for Growth and the endorsement of Ron Paul, who had previously represented parts of the district. On June 30, 2018, he won the special election, defeating Democratic nominee Eric Holguin, 55% to 32%.

2018 regular election

Cloud defeated Holguin again in November, along with independent candidate James Duerr and Libertarian candidate Daniel Tinus, with 60.3% of the vote.

2020 

Cloud defeated Democratic nominee Ricardo "Rick" De La Fuente and Libertarian candidate Phil Gray with 63.1% of the vote.

Tenure
Cloud was sworn in on July 10, 2018.

In December 2020, Cloud was one of 126 Republican members of the House of Representatives to sign an amicus brief in support of Texas v. Pennsylvania, a lawsuit filed at the United States Supreme Court contesting the results of the 2020 presidential election, in which Joe Biden defeated incumbent Donald Trump. The Supreme Court declined to hear the case on the basis that Texas lacked standing under Article III of the Constitution to challenge the results of an election held by another state.

During the 2021 storming of the United States Capitol, Cloud and his colleagues were ushered to a secure location. Later, video footage of him surfaced in which he refused to wear a mask, in violation of House rules.

Cloud was one of 12 House Republicans to vote against HR 1085, to award three Congressional Gold Medals to the United States Capitol Police who protected the Capitol on January 6, 2021. In a statement defending his vote, he said, "I have always stood by and supported our brave law enforcement and still do but this bill was not truly about that, despite its name. Instead of simply being about honoring the Capitol Police who bravely protected the Capitol on January 6th, Speaker Pelosi included damaging language that unnecessarily weighs down the bill. The text refers to the Capitol as the temple of democracy. Simply put, it’s not a temple and Congress should not refer to it as one. The federal government is not a god." In June 2021, Cloud and 20 other House Republicans voted against a similar resolution.

On January 3, 2023, at the beginning of the 118th Congress, Cloud voted for Jim Jordan to be the U.S. House Speaker, in rebuke of House Minority Leader Kevin McCarthy.

Iraq
In June 2021, Cloud was one of 49 House Republicans to vote to repeal the AUMF against Iraq.

Syria
In 2023, Cloud was among 47 Republicans to vote in favor of H.Con.Res. 21 which directed President Joe Biden to remove U.S. troops from Syria within 180 days.

Immigration
Cloud voted against the Further Consolidated Appropriations Act of 2020 which authorizes DHS to nearly double the available H-2B visas for the remainder of FY 2020.

Cloud voted against the Consolidated Appropriations Act (H.R. 1158), which effectively prohibits Immigration and Customs Enforcement from cooperating with the Department of Health and Human Services to detain or remove illegal alien sponsors of Unaccompanied Alien Children.

Big Tech
In 2022, Cloud was one of 39 Republicans to vote for the Merger Filing Fee Modernization Act of 2022, an antitrust package that would crack down on corporations for anti-competitive behavior.

Committee assignments 
Committee on Oversight and Reform
Subcommittee on Economic and Consumer Policy (Ranking Member)
Subcommittee on Civil Rights and Civil Liberties
Subcommittee on National Security
Committee on Science, Space, and Technology
Subcommittee on Energy

Caucus memberships 
 Freedom Caucus
Republican Study Committee

Electoral history

Personal Life 
Cloud is Protestant.

References

External links 

 Congressman Cloud official U.S. House website
 Campaign website
 
 
 

|-

1975 births
21st-century American politicians
American Protestants
Christians from Texas
Living people
Oral Roberts University alumni
People from Victoria, Texas
Politicians from Baton Rouge, Louisiana
Protestants from Texas
Republican Party members of the United States House of Representatives from Texas